Runnymede Drama Group ("RDG") is a community theatre group based in Chertsey, Surrey that is notable for not only for its longevity, but also for its success both at a national and international level being one of the few groups to have won every major festival in the United Kingdom and having also been selected to represent the United Kingdom on the international stage.

History
Based in the Surrey town of Chertsey, RDG was founded in 1948. It stages at least five productions each year, including drama festival entries. The group has also been noted for its production and promotion of new material, such as its 2000 production of Scarecrow.

Festival honours
National Drama Festivals Association - British All Winners Drama Festival
2012 - Winners
2006 - Runners-Up
2002 - Winners
2000 - Winners
1993 - selected to appear in festival
1977 - selected to appear in festival
National Festival of Community Theatre
British Final Festival of One Act Plays
2002 - Selected to represent England (winners of English festival)
2000 - Overall Winners
1993 - Selected to represent England (winners of English festival)
All-England Theatre Festival
2002 - English Winners
2000 - English Winners
1996 - English semi-finalists
1993 - English Winners
1977 - English semi-finalists
International Festival of Amateur Theatre - Mondial du Théâtre
Represented the United Kingdom in 2001 in Monaco.

References

Amateur theatre companies in England